Rathmullan is a seaside village and townland on the Fanad Peninsula in County Donegal, Ireland. Rathmullan has historical significance as the scene of the Flight of the Earls in 1607, a major turning point in Irish history.

Places of interest
There are also the ruins of the Carmelite Friary in Rathmullan which was built by Eoghan Rua MacSweeney in 1516. The Friary was sacked by the English garrison from Sligo in 1595. In 1617 the Friary was occupied by the Protestant Bishop of Raphoe, The Rt. Rev. Dr. Andrew Knox.   A subsequent Bishop of Raphoe turned it into a fortified house in anticipation of a possible French invasion during the Napoleonic Wars. 

In 1607, Rathmullan was also said to have seen the last of the Gaelic Order, most notably the Clan Ó Néill and the Clan Ó Domhnaill, during the Flight of the Earls to the Continent. This 'flight' took place from Portnamurray on the southern edge of the town. 

There are the remains of a Martello Tower or battery in the town which serves as a heritage centre.  The tower was one of six originally built in 1812 by the British as part of a defence along Lough Swilly against feared Napoleonic invasion. These Batteries were manned up until the end of the First World War to protect British warships which were moored in Lough Swilly.

Facilities
Facilities in Rathmullan include shops, a resource centre, The Looking Glass Spa Therapy, Drumhalla House, and also hotels such as Rathmullan House, Fort Royal (closed down in 2015) and the Water's Edge (now closed).

There are three churches in Rathmullan: St. Joseph's Catholic Church, St. Columb's Church of Ireland (Parish of Killygarvan), and the Rathmullan Presbyterian Church.

Lough Swilly Deep Sea Fishing Festival
The sea is a large part of the lives of the people of Rathmullan and Lough Swilly Deep Sea Fishing Festival held in June is evidence of this.
The 2007 festival took place on Sat, 2 June, and Sun, 3 June.

Notable people
 Ian Anderson, former President of the Legislative Council of the Isle of Man.
 Mary McAlister
Hugh Law, Lord Chancellor of Ireland, died here in 1883.
Anne Byrne (née Proctor), Pre-Pregnancy Midwife (Glasgow), born here in 1942 (Died 2016). First Donegal person to receive an honorary MBE in 2001.

Literature 
Rathmullan is the setting for Australian/British author Brand King's novel An Irish Winter, published in 2020. The story follows the gradually intertwining lives of Alice and Felix, who arrive in the village following traumatic upheavals in their private lives. Many features of the village are described in detail in the novel, with the beach getting special attention. The traditional new year's day cold water swim also features, along with wildlife such as seals and rooks, while a number of scenes are set in the Beachcomber Bar and An Bonnan Bui Cafe.

See also
 List of abbeys and priories in Ireland (County Donegal)
 List of towns and villages in the Republic of Ireland
 List of towns in Northern Ireland
 List of abbeys and priories in the Republic of Ireland
 List of abbeys and priories in Northern Ireland

References

Towns and villages in County Donegal
Townlands of County Donegal